The following is a list of the best-selling singles in Belgium. Depends on the measurement, list is divided by claimed sales and official certifications from Ultratop, which online base operated since 1995.

List

References

External links 
 Belgium's certification database

Singles, best-selling
Belgium
Belgian music